Kumanovo Town Cemetery is located in the southeast part of Kumanovo, North Macedonia.

Buildings
 Church of Resurrection of Christ

Other
In 2006 there was vandalism of the grave of the brother of the current Mayor of Kumanovo.

Notable interments
 Vladimir Antonov architect
 Dragan Bogdanovski Political dissident
 Dejan Jakimovski Soldier
 Marjan Trajkovikj Military pilot
 Tode Ilich former mayor of Kumanovo
 Jezdimir Bogdanski former mayor of Kumanovo
 Boris Protikj former mayor of Kumanovo
 Boris Chushkarov first director of OZNA for SR Macedonia
 Momchilo Jovanovski former mayor of Kumanovo

References

Cemeteries in North Macedonia
Kumanovo